Eucithara lyra is a small sea snail, a marine gastropod mollusc in the family Mangeliidae.

Description
The length of the shell attains 7 mm.

The color of the shell is light yellowish brown, or yellowish white, banded narrowly and numerously with chestnut.

Distribution
This marine species occurs off the Philippines, Taiwan, and Queensland, Australia.

References

  Reeve, L.A. 1846. Monograph of the genus Mangelia. pls 1-8 in Reeve, L.A. (ed). Conchologia Iconica. London : L. Reeve & Co. Vol. 3.
 Smith, E.A. 1876. A list of marine shells, chiefly from the Solomon Islands, with descriptions of several new species. Journal of the Linnean Society of London, Zoology 12: 535-562, pl. 30
 Schepman, M.M. 1913. Toxoglossa. pp. 384–396 in Weber, M. & de Beaufort, L.F. (eds). The Prosobranchia, Pulmonata and Opisthobranchia Tectibranchiata, Tribe Bullomorpha, of the Siboga Expedition. Monograph 49. Siboga Expeditie 32(2)
 Cernohorsky, W.O. 1978. Tropical Pacific Marine Shells. Sydney : Pacific Publications 352 pp., 68 pls.

External links
  Tucker, J.K. 2004 Catalog of recent and fossil turrids (Mollusca: Gastropoda). Zootaxa 682:1-1295
  Hedley, C. 1922. A revision of the Australian Turridae. Records of the Australian Museum 13(6): 213-359, pls 42-56

lyra
Gastropods described in 1846